Alternative for Change ( - AC), formerly known as "Christian Alternative," is a Nicaraguan political party.

It was founded by dissidents from the Nicaraguan Party of the Christian Path (CCN), most notably Orlando Tardencilla. In the 2006 presidential elections, the party fielded Edén Pastora as its presidential candidate, but Pastora only managed to obtain 0.27% of the vote.

References

External links 
 managua.gob.ni
 el19digital.com

Political parties in Nicaragua
Christian political parties